Bruce R. Rendon is a former member of the Michigan House of Representatives, first elected in 2010 and re-elected to a second term in 2012. His district consists of Missaukee, Roscommon, Ogemaw, Kalkaska, and Otsego Counties. He was term-limited in 2016 and was succeeded by his wife, Daire.

He is the owner and operator of Rendon Quality Construction, the owner of Renmoor Jersey Farm, a former president and director of the Michigan Jersey Cattle Club, a member and three-time president of the Northwest Michigan Home Builders Association, and a former president of the Michigan Association of Home Builders.

References

1951 births
Living people
Republican Party members of the Michigan House of Representatives
People from Hastings, Michigan
People from Lake City, Michigan
Ferris State University alumni
21st-century American politicians